Tiffany Haddish is an American stand-up comedian, actress and author. Her breakthrough came in 2017, when she garnered critical acclaim for her performance in the comedy film Girls Trip. Haddish has won a Primetime Emmy Award for her work as a host on a Saturday Night Live episode, and published a memoir, The Last Black Unicorn. She starred in the TBS series The Last O.G., and executive produced and voiced Tuca in the Netflix/Adult Swim animated series Tuca & Bertie. In 2021, she won a Grammy Award for Best Comedy Album for her comedy album Black Mitzvah, making her the second African-American woman to win this prize after Whoopi Goldberg in 1986.

Film

Television

Music videos

Video games

References 

American filmographies
Actress filmographies